Blanco was a compound used primarily by soldiers throughout the Commonwealth from 1880 onwards to clean and colour their equipment. It was first used by the British Army to whiten Slade Wallace buckskin leather equipment, and later adapted to coloured versions for use on the cotton Web Infantry Equipment, Pattern 1908 webbing. Blanco became widely used throughout both world wars.

Description
Blanco initially came in either powder manufactured by the Mills Equipment Company (who designed and were a primary manufacturer of the webbing it was used on), or round cake form, much like soap, manufactured by Pickerings and which used the tradename "Blanco" and was used as a cleaning and colouring compound. (The compound was manufactured in Canada as "Capo".)  Blanco was applied with a brush and water, and rubbed into the woven cotton material of load bearing equipment, to provide a consistent colour to equipment worn by soldiers in the same unit, and as a method of cleaning the gear. Post-war experimental rectangular waxy blocks became available with greater waterproofing abilities but after 1954 Joseph Pickering & Sons Ltd introduced a tinned paste product that didn't need the addition of water and could be applied directly from the tin. Other manufacturers made competing tinned paste products until the 1980s.

Blanco came in many different colours, the most common being either the original No. 7 (British No. 61 Buff), a "khaki" colour which in practice was a tan shade, or one of two shades of green, either No. 9 or British No. 3 Khaki Green. Other colours included black (used by Royal Armoured Corps and rifle regiments per regimental custom), white (for ceremonial duties or military policemen on traffic control duty) or blue (by air force units), the latter being a shade known as "RAF Blue" for use on the RAF blue-grey web equipment.

Post-war use
A post-war blanco colour adopted by at least one unit of the Parachute Regiment (5th - later renumbered 15th Scottish Battalion) was maroon, using the waxy form of blanco to give a shiny scuff-resistant finish.

As the use of cotton webbing declined, and was replaced by nylon and other synthetic materials, the need for blanco, and its complementary product, Brasso, in maintaining personal military equipment, disappeared.

Impact
The word "Blanco" itself also became used as a verb, as in "to blanco a piece of equipment".  The past tense of blanco is usually seen in print as "blancoed".

It appears in the phrase "Bull, Blanco and Brasso" to refer to the methods used to bring uniform to immaculate condition.

References

Cleaning products
British Army equipment